Pipe Dreams is the tenth studio album by Murray Head. It was released in 1995.

Track listing
All songs composed by Murray Head unless noted.
"Who Loves You" (Bob Gaudio, Judy Parker) – 4:20
"Only a Pipe Dream" (Murray Head, Ian Maidman) – 6:09
"Prison Wall Blues" (Gus Cannon) – 3:54
"Si tu veux être un homme" (Head, Rudyard Kipling, Ian Maidman, André Maurois) – 6:53
"Shadows of the Truth" – 6:06
"Dancing Flamenco Alone" (Head, Maidman) – 5:49
"When They Found Eldorado" (Head, Maidman) – 4:56
"Is That All There Is?" (Jerry Leiber, Mike Stoller) – 3:57
"Over the Hill" – 6:14
"Fair and Tender Ladies" (Traditional) – 6:51
"Hesitation Blues" (Rev. Gary Davis) – 3:15
"India Song" (Carlos d'Alessio, Marguerite Duras) – 4:21
"Sedentary Nomad" – 5:56
"Ca n'était que ça" – 5:16 (Caroline Cochaux, Jerry Leiber, Mike Stoller)

Personnel
Murray Head – vocals, acoustic guitar 
Ian Maidman – guitar, keyboards, drums, vocals, multi-instruments
Phil Palmer – guitar
Geoff Richardson – viola, slide guitar
Pinise Saul – solo vocal 
Annie Whitehead – trombone, vocals
Paul Higgs – bagpipes, Northumbrian smallpipes
Steve Fletcher – piano, accordion, vocals
Jo Fletcher –  vocals
Caroline Cochaux –  vocals
Simon Jefferies - vocals
Philip Saatchi – vocals
Mitt Gamon – harmonica

External links
Pipe Dreams at the official Murray Head site.
[ Pipe Dreams] at Allmusic

Murray Head albums
1995 albums